Marbach may refer to:    

Places in Germany

 Marbach, Marburg, Marbach is a district of Marburg in Hesse
 Marbach stud or Weil-Marbach, a major center of horse breeding dating back several centuries, in Baden-Württemberg
 Part of Erbach (Odenwald) in Hessen
 Part of Gomadingen, Baden-Württemberg ('Marbach an der Lauter')
 Part of Lauda-Königshofen, Main-Tauber-Kreis, Baden-Württemberg
 Part of Petersberg, Hesse, district Fulda
 the town Marbach am Neckar, district Ludwigsburg, Baden-Württemberg
Marbach (Neckar) station
 Marbach (Lauda-Königshofen), a district of Lauda-Königshofen, Baden-Württemberg
 Marbach (Mergbach), a river of Hesse, tributary of the Mergbach

Places in Austria
 the town  Marbach an der Donau in Lower Austria

Places in Switzerland
Marbach, St. Gallen, a municipality in the canton of St. Gallen
Marbach, Lucerne, a former municipality in the canton of Lucerne
Escholzmatt-Marbach, a municipality in the canton of Lucerne
Places in the United States 

Marbach Road in San Antonio Texas. 

Marbach is home of the Marbach Cut. 

People
Johann Marbach (1521–1581), German Lutheran reformer
Karl-Heinz Marbach (1917–1995), German navi officer in WW II
Joseph J. Marbach (1935–2001), expert in the field of facial pain

Other users
Marbach (crater) on Mars